Forrest Alexander Wall (born November 20, 1995) is an American professional baseball outfielder in the Atlanta Braves organization. He was drafted in the first round of the 2014 Major League Baseball draft by the Colorado Rockies.

Career
Wall attended Orangewood Christian High School in Maitland, Florida. A four-year starter on the baseball team, he hit .461 with nine home runs, 70 runs batted in and 70 stolen bases in 79 career games.

Colorado Rockies
Wall was drafted by the Colorado Rockies 35th overall in the 2014 Major League Baseball draft. He signed with the Rockies and made his professional debut with the Grand Junction Rockies. Wall spent 2014 with the Grand Junction Rockies where he posted a .318 batting average with three home runs and 24 RBIs, along with 18 stolen bases. In 2015, Wall played 99 games for the Asheville Tourists and four games for the Boise Hawks while on a rehab assignment. Wall ended 2015 with a .286 batting average along with seven home runs and 47 RBIs.

Prior to the 2016 season, MLB.com named him the 4th best second base prospect in baseball. Wall spent 2016 with the Modesto Nuts, where he posted a .264 batting average with six home runs and 56 RBIs. He started 2017 with the Lancaster JetHawks where he batted .299 with three home runs, 16 RBIs, and a .832 OPS in 22 games before a dislocated shoulder forced him to miss the remainder of the season. Wall began the 2018 season with Lancaster before receiving a promotion to the Double-A Hartford Yard Goats.

Toronto Blue Jays
On July 26, 2018, the Rockies traded Wall, Chad Spanberger, and either a player to be named later or cash considerations to the Toronto Blue Jays for Seung-hwan Oh. Wall finished out the season with the Double-A New Hampshire Fisher Cats, hitting .271/.354/.380 in 35 games. In 2019, Wall split the season between New Hampshire and the Triple-A Buffalo Bisons, slashing .268/.351/.422 with 11 home runs and 45 RBI in 123 games between the two teams. Wall did not play in a game in 2020 due to the cancellation of the minor league season because of the COVID-19 pandemic. He elected free agency on November 2, 2020. On December 15, 2020, Wall re-signed with the Blue Jays on a minor league contract and was invited to Spring Training. In 2021, Wall spent the year with Triple-A Buffalo, posting a slash of .266/.343/.360 with 1 home run and 20 RBI in 78 games. He elected free agency following the season on November 7, 2021.

Seattle Mariners
On March 14, 2022, Wall signed a minor league contract with the Seattle Mariners that included an invitation to Spring Training. Wall played in 120 games for the Triple-A Tacoma Rainiers, batting .255/.333/.354 with 6 home runs, 41 RBI, and a league-leading 52 stolen bases. He elected free agency on November 10, 2022.

Atlanta Braves
On January 30, 2023, Wall signed a minor league contract with the Atlanta Braves organization.

References

External links

1995 births
Living people
Asheville Tourists players
Baseball players from Florida
Baseball outfielders
Baseball second basemen
Boise Hawks players
Buffalo Bisons (minor league) players
Grand Junction Rockies players
Hartford Yard Goats players
Lancaster JetHawks players
Modesto Nuts players
New Hampshire Fisher Cats players
Sportspeople from Winter Park, Florida
Tacoma Rainiers players